Osadebamwen Moses Okoro (born 7 September 1990) is a Nigerian international footballer who plays for Enugu Rangers, as a midfielder.

Personal life
Okoro's brothers, Stanley and Charles, are also footballers.

Club career
Okoro has played club football in Nigeria for Bayelsa United, Heartland and Enugu Rangers.

In December 2016, he was crowned the Edo Footballer of the Year by the Edo FA

International career
He made his international debut for Nigeria in 2011. He was named in the Nigerian team for the 2011 CAF U-23 Championship and 2016 African Nations Championship.

International goals
Scores and results list Nigeria's goal tally first.

References

External links

1990 births
Living people
Nigerian footballers
Nigerian expatriate footballers
Nigeria international footballers
2011 CAF U-23 Championship players
Bayelsa United F.C. players
Heartland F.C. players
Rangers International F.C. players
Association football midfielders
Expatriate footballers in Zambia
Buildcon F.C. players
Nigerian expatriate sportspeople in Zambia
Nigeria A' international footballers
2016 African Nations Championship players
2018 African Nations Championship players